Det snöar i Indianien ("It's Snowing in Indiania") was the 1999 edition of Sveriges Radio's Christmas Calendar. The music of the series was written by Martin Svensson and Dilba, at this time both were together and worked together a lot.

Plot
The series is set in the fictional Native American village of "Indianien", located in a glade next to a river.

References
 

1999 radio programme debuts
1999 radio programme endings
Native Americans in popular culture
Sveriges Radio's Christmas Calendar